Shanduke McPhatter is a Community  Leader based in Brooklyn, New York City. He is the founder and chief executive officer of Gangstas Making Astronomical Community Change (GMACC), a non-profit organization that focuses on Gun violence Prevention & Human Justice issues. He is a reformed Bloods gang leader.

Life and career

McPhatter grew up in public housing in Boerum Hill, Brooklyn. His mother raised him, but he never knew his father. McPhatter was first arrested at age 16 for a strong-arm mugging. A few years after that, he spent his first stint in jail for allegedly robbing a store, although he has continually maintained his innocence in that case. He took a three-year plea deal in 1996 in that matter to avoid the possibility of a 15-year prison sentence. While imprisoned at Rikers Island, he joined the Bloods gang. He also adopted the name "Trife Gangsta". McPhatter would later spend time in Comstock Correctional Facility, Clinton Correctional Facility, and [Elmira Correctional Facility] on a variety of Robbery,drug-related and other convictions.

In 1999, he earned a job as a security guard, working with a company until 2001, when it was discovered they were in violation of a state law prohibiting convicted felons from working as security guards. He went back to selling drugs at that time in Gowanus, Brooklyn. In 2003, he was arrested for murder, but the charges were later dropped in 2004 when the actual gunman in the case came forward. McPhatter remained in and out of prison until his most recent release in April 2008. He formulated the plans for his non-profit organization, Gangstas Making Astronomical Community Changes (GMACC), while still behind bars. He also earned his GED while in prison.

After his release, McPhatter began canvassing Brooklyn neighborhoods with other residents and Brooklyn council member, Jumaane Williams, to combat gun violence. Williams advocated for GMACC, partially because its programs were similar to the Cure Violence program in use throughout the city. This eventually led to GMACC receiving government funding. In 2015, GMACC opened its first headquarters at a location in East Flatbush. McPhatter helped open a second GMACC office in Fort Greene in January 2019. In addition to organizing marches against gun violence, the organization also offers mental health counseling, job training, conflict mediation, educational resources, and mentorship (among other services). New York City officials credited the organization for a 30% reduction in gun crime in its precinct between 2012 and 2017.

References

External links
Gangstas Making Astronomical Community Changes

Year of birth missing (living people)
Living people
People from Brooklyn
Community activists
Activists from New York City
Former gang members
American nonprofit chief executives
Social justice activists
Candidates in the 2021 United States elections